David Vincent Calloway (born October 7, 1968) is an American college basketball coach and the former head men's basketball coach at Monmouth University.

Raised in the Williamstown of Monroe Township, Gloucester County, New Jersey, Calloway starred at St. Joseph High School. While coaching at Monmouth, Calloway was a resident of Belmar, New Jersey.

Head coaching record

References

1968 births
Living people
St. Joseph Academy (New Jersey) alumni
American men's basketball coaches
Basketball players from New Jersey
Monmouth Hawks men's basketball coaches
Monmouth Hawks men's basketball players
Sportspeople from Woodbury, New Jersey
Basketball coaches from New Jersey
People from Belmar, New Jersey
People from Monroe Township, Gloucester County, New Jersey
American men's basketball players